The 1944 Maine Black Bears football team was an American football team that represented the University of Maine as a member of the New England Conference during the 1944 college football season. In its second season under head coach William C. Kenyon, the team compiled a 2–2 record (1–1 against conference opponents) and tied for the conference championship.  The team played its home games at Alumni Field in Orono, Maine. Eugene Long was the team captain.

Schedule

References

Maine
Maine Black Bears football seasons
Maine Black Bears football